The Bohuslän Regiment, designation I 17, was a Swedish Army infantry  regiment that traces its origins back 1661. It was disbanded in 1992. The regiment's soldiers were originally recruited from the provinces of Bohuslän, and it was later garrisoned there in the town Uddevalla.

Heraldry and traditions

Colours, standards and guidons
The colour was presented to the former Royal Bohuslän Regiment (I 17) in Uddevalla by King Gustaf VI Adolf on 27 August 1961. The colour was drawn by Brita Grep and embroidered by hand in insertion technique by the company Libraria. It was used as regimental colour by I 17 until 1 July 1992 and as a National Home Guard colour (Uddevalla Northern Home Guard District) 1992–1997. Blazon: "On white cloth the provincial badge of Bohuslän; a red tower em-battled with two yellow portcullis with black hinges and locks, between dexter an erect blue sword and sinister a yellow lion rampant. On a red border at the upper side of the colour, battle honours in white." Battle honours: Lund (1676), Landskrona (1677), Hälsingborg (1710), Gadebusch (1712) and Svensksund (1790).

Coat of arms
The coat of the arms of the Bohuslän Regiment (I 17) 1977–1992 and the Bohus-Dal Group since 1997. Blazon: "Argent, the provincial badge of Bohuslän, a castle with a tower both embattled gules; masoned sable, two portcullis or charged with hinges and locks sable between a sword erect azure and a lion rampant of the last, armed and langued or. The shield surmounted two muskets in saltire or".

Memorial stones
In 1901, the regiment raised a memorial stone of the Battle of Svensksund at its former military camp, Backamo, in connection with a visit by the German regiment Graf Roon. This German regiment is derives from the former Psilanderhielmska Regiment based in Pomerania, which in 1796 became named after the newly arrived commander von Engelbrechten. When the regiment moved in to Uddevalla, the monument was moved to the adjacent regiment park at the present Bohuslän Defense Museum.

Heritage
In connection with the decommissioning of Bohuslän Regiment, its traditions came from 1 July 1992 onwards to be kept by the Bohus Group.

Commanding officers
Regimental commanders:

Commanders

1720–1728: Ture Gabriel Bielke
1720–1721: Jean Louis Bousquet (acting)
1722–1724: Johan Fredrik Didron (acting)
1728–1740: Axel Erik Roos
1740–1746: Anders Tungelfeldt
1746–1758: Georg Reinhold von Köhler
1759–1763: Lars Åkerhielm
1763–1769: Georg Gustaf Wrangel
1769–1775: Mauritz Casimir Lewenhaupt
1775–1781: Axel Didrik Meijendorff von Yxkull
1781–1790: Jan Verner Tranefelt
1789–1792: Hans Henric von Essen (acting)
1790–1792: Gustav Wachtmeister
1792–1793: Fredrik Adolf von Numers
1793–1796: Adolf Fredrik Påhlman
1796–1810: Johan Leonard Belfrage
1810–1821: Erik Wilhelm Haij
1818–1821: Philip von Mecklenburg (acting)
1821–1838: Philip von Mecklenburg
1838–1856: Georg Gillis von Heideman
1856–1868: Henrik Nauckhoff
1868–1881: Georg Fleetwood
1881–1882: Otto Taube
1881–1882: Axel Rappe (acting)
1882–1885: Axel Rappe
1885–1890: Axel Rudenschöld
1890–1892: Christer Oxehufvud
1890–1892: Mathias Fjellman (acting)
1892–1898: Mathias Fjellman
1898–1907: Olof Malm
1907–1915: Charles Tottie
1914–1915: Olof Werling Melin (acting)
1915–1921: Olof Werling Melin
1921–1923: Bengt Ribbing
1923–1930: Victor Landegren
1930–1936: Harald Malmberg
1936–1937: Thorsten Rudenschiöld (acting)
1937–1942: Thorsten Rudenschiöld
1942–1948: Sven Öberg
1948–1957: Erik Sellin
1957–1963: Gunnar Smedmark
1963–1966: Claës Skoglund
1966–1971: Bertil Kamph
1971–1977: Gunnar Åberg
1977–1980: Åke von Schéele
1980–1982: Lars Löfberg
1982–1983: Arne Rolff (acting)
1983–1985: Arne Rolff
1985–1987: Jan-Olof Borgén
1987–1990: Kaj Sjösten
1990–1990: Lennart Bergqvist
1991–1992: Lars Andréasson

Deputy commanders
1969–19??: Lieutenant colonel Arne Rolff
1982–1983: Colonel Arne Rolff

Names, designations and locations

See also
List of Swedish infantry regiments

Footnotes

References

Notes

Print

Further reading

Infantry regiments of the Swedish Army
Disbanded units and formations of Sweden
Military units and formations established in 1720
Military units and formations disestablished in 1992
1720 establishments in Sweden
1992 disestablishments in Sweden